The Memorial Hall of Founding of Yilan Administration (colloquially, Founding Memorial Hall) is a memorial hall dedicated to the founding of Yilan County Government  located in Yilan City, Yilan County, Taiwan.

History
The memorial hall building was originally built in 1900 where it used to be the official residence of magistrates. The building was later converted into a memorial hall and was inaugurated on 13 December 1997.

Architecture
The total area of the memorial hall complex is 2,648 m2 and with a building space of 245 m2. It is a mix of Japanese wooden house and western classical building style.

Exhibitions
The memorial hall displays major historical events in Yilan County.

Transportation
The memorial hall is accessible within walking distance west of Yilan Station of Taiwan Railways.

See also
 List of tourist attractions in Taiwan

References

External links

 

1997 establishments in Taiwan
Buildings and structures completed in 1920
Tourist attractions in Yilan County, Taiwan